Aurora, also known as Aurora UK, are a British electronic dance music group, consisting of keyboardist/guitarist Sacha Collisson (born 14 November 1970) and fellow keyboardist Simon Greenaway (born 4 July 1969).

Discography

Albums

Singles
"Hear You Calling" (1999) No. 71 UK
"Hear You Calling" (re-issue) (2000) No. 17 UK
"Ordinary World" (2000) No. 5 UK (originally by Duran Duran)
"Dreaming" (2002) No. 24 UK
"The Day It Rained Forever" (2002) No. 29 UK
"If You Could Read My Mind" (2002) (originally by Gordon Lightfoot)
"Sleeping Satellite" (2003) – No. 60 Australia (originally by Tasmin Archer)
"Real Life" (2005)
"Summer Son" (2006) No. 82 UK (originally by Texas)
"Love Resurrection" (2009) (originally by Alison Moyet)

References

External links
 SACHA COLLISSON MUSIC

British trance music groups
English house music duos
Musical groups established in 1999
1999 establishments in the United Kingdom
Musical groups from South Yorkshire